Oleynik, also Oleinik may refer to:
Larisa Oleynik (born 1981), American actress
Anatoly V. Oleynik, Professor of Chemistry at the University of Nizhni Novgorod
Alexey Oleinik
Olga Arsenievna Oleinik (1925–2001), Soviet mathematician
Aleksandr Oleinik
Frank Oleynick (born 1955), American retired basketball player

See also
 
Olynyk
Olenik
Olejnik, Polish version
Oliynyk, Ukrainian version